Qorban Kohestani is an ethnic Hazara politician from Afghanistan, who was the representative of the people of Ghor province in the 15th and 16th term of the Afghanistan Parliament.

Early life 
Qorban Kohestani was born on 1961 in Lal wa Sarjangal District of Ghor province. He has a bachelor's degree in economics in higher education.

See also 
 List of Hazara people

References 

Living people
1961 births
Hazara politicians
People from Ghor Province